In January 1942 the Director of Material and Procurement was appointed to coordinate all material procurement activities of the US Navy. The office would be supervised by the War Production Board until late 1945.

In 1948 the office title was changed to Chief of Division of Material, and in 1984 to Chief of the Office of Naval Material. In 1983 title was changed to Naval Material Command. On 6 May 1985, the SECNAV secretary John Lehman disestablished the Command. Acquisition functions were passed onto the following Commands: Naval Air Systems Command, Naval Sea Systems Command, Space and Naval Warfare Systems Command, Naval Facilities Engineering Command, Naval Supply Systems Command, and the Strategic Systems Program Office. The Office of Naval Acquisition Support was established to create acquisition support for functions that span across Commands, and that require a degree of independence in their operations.

See also 
Ship Characteristics Board
United States Navy bureau system
United States Army Services of Supply
Army Service Forces

References

Notes

Sources

Shore commands of the United States Navy
Military logistics units and formations of the United States Navy
Military units and formations disestablished in 1983